Leo Roth (1914–2002), also known as Lior Roth, was an Israeli painter, born in 1914 in Austria-Hungary.

In 1920, Roth moved to Germany and, in 1933, immigrated to Palestine. He studied at the École des Beaux-Arts in Paris and completed frescoes in Italy and France in the 1950s. Roth first settled in Tel Aviv, then moved to Kvutzat Kinneret, then finally to Kibbutz Afikim where he remained until his death. He served as Director of the Art Academy of the Kibbutzim. In 1959, he was awarded the Jordan Valley Prize for Painting. Roth exhibited in the United States, Israel, Mexico, Spain, Holland, Sweden, and Denmark. He died in 2002.

Roth's work was influenced by Cubism and bears much in common with the work of compatriot painter Naftali Bezem. His colourful canvases contain biblical imagery and references to early Israeli pioneer culture.

Selected exhibitions
 2000: Chaim Atar Art Museum, Ein Harod, Israel: The Works of Leo Roth: An Exhibition

Selected collections
 Israel Museum, Jerusalem
 Museum of Art Ein Harod, Israel

Published works
 Reproductions in Colour and Black & White (Reproduktsyot bi-tsevaim uve-shahor-lavan) [portfolio of plates]. [1973].

References

External links 
 Bar-Or, Galia & Dvora Liss. Leo Roth: Shepherd of Longings [exhibition catalogue]. Kiriat Bialik: Ach, 2000
 Leo Roth at the Israeli Art Centre (Israel Museum, Jerusalem)
 Artnet.com (Leo Roth)

Jewish painters
Polish emigrants to Germany
Jewish emigrants from Nazi Germany to Mandatory Palestine
Jews from Galicia (Eastern Europe)
École des Beaux-Arts alumni
1914 births
2002 deaths
20th-century Israeli painters
21st-century Israeli painters